Black Jack is an unincorporated community within Simpson County, Kentucky, United States.

References

Unincorporated communities in Simpson County, Kentucky
Unincorporated communities in Kentucky